Patuelli is a surname. Notable people with the surname include:

 Alessia Patuelli (born 2002), Italian racing cyclist
 Luca Patuelli (born 1984), Canadian b-boy